Coelomomyces elegans is a species of mosquito parasitic fungi, in the genus Coelomomyces. It has been found in Culex gelidus mosquitoes, in Matara, Sri Lanka.

It is distinguishable from other species of Coelomomycetacea by its resting sporangia, which are ornamented by circular depressed areas with papillae. Other distinct features include prominent vertical striae within ridges and a dehiscence split bordered by papillae.

References 

Blastocladiomycota
Fungi described in 1985
Fungi of Sri Lanka
Parasitic fungi
Parasites of Diptera